Temnothorax lichtensteini is a Mediterranean species of ant in the genus Temnothorax.

References 

Myrmicinae
Insects described in 1918